José Antonio Pavón Jiménez or José Antonio Pavón (April 22, 1754 in Casatejada, Cáceres, Spain – 1840 in Madrid) was a Spanish botanist known for researching the flora of Peru and Chile.

During the reign of Charles III of Spain, three major botanical expeditions were sent to the New World; Pavón and Hipólito Ruiz López were the botanists for the first of these expeditions, to Peru and Chile from 1777 to 1788. The standard author abbreviation Ruiz & Pav. is used to indicate Pavón and his colleague Ruiz as joint authors when citing a botanical name.

The genus Pavonia was named in his honor by his contemporary, Spanish botanist Antonio José Cavanilles — plants with the specific epithet of pavonii also commemorate his name.

See also
 Botanical Expedition to the Viceroyalty of Peru
 List of taxa named by Ruiz and Pavón

References

Further reading

External links

 Short biography
"Flora Peruviana et Chilensis" Vols. I-III available online at Botanicus.org website
José Antonio Pavón. Polymath Virtual Library, Fundación Ignacio Larramendi

19th-century Spanish botanists
Flora of Chile
 
1754 births
1840 deaths
18th-century Spanish botanists